RIK-210 is a star located north of Scorpius. It is known for its mysterious dimming events. The dips are observed with stable period of 5.667 days, but their triangular shape is inconsistent with the planetary eclipses. Instead, the diffuse cloud on synchronous orbit may be responsible.

References

M-type stars
Scorpius (constellation)
J16232454-1717270
Pre-main-sequence stars